Anna Nagar twin arches are ornamental twin arches located in Anna Nagar, Chennai, India. It was built on 1 January 1986 to commemorate the platinum jubilee of the former Chief Minister of Tamil Nadu C. N. Annadurai. Located at the junction of Poonamallee High Road and Anna Nagar Third Avenue, the arches are one of the most prominent landmarks in the city and serve as the entrance of the suburb of Anna Nagar from the southern side.

History
The twin arches were built in 1985 by the Corporation of Madras to commemorate the platinum jubilee of the former Chief Minister of Tamil Nadu C. N. Annadurai. Built at a cost of  1.2 million, the arches were completed in 105 days and were inaugurated on 1 January 1986 by former Chief Minister M. G. Ramachandran. The arches were designed by sculptor Ganapathy Sthapathi, who was honoured during the inauguration of the arches.

The structure
The arches measure 57 feet in height.

See also

 Anna Nagar Tower Park
 Architecture of Chennai

References

Buildings and structures in Chennai
Monuments and memorials in Chennai
Memorials to C. N. Annadurai
Arches and vaults in India